WTT HK Limited, was the second largest fixed line telecommunication operator in Hong Kong. In 2018, it was acquired by competitor HKBN and renamed to HKBN Enterprise Solutions HK Limited.

A member of the business groups TPG Capital and MBK Partners, as well as formerly The Wharf (Holdings), WTT HK was formerly known as Wharf T&T Limited, New T&T Limited and Wharf New T&T Limited.

History

Established in 1995 as New T&T Limited, it was one of the first telecommunication operators to be offered a fixed line license after the Hong Kong Government decided to open this market to competition; Cable & Wireless Hong Kong Telecom had heretofore enjoyed a monopoly. The next year New T&T Limited was offering IDD service and residential fixed-line services.

Making its first net profit in financial year 2001, it was soon after renamed Wharf New T&T Limited.

Another name change, in 2003, yielded Wharf T&T Limited.

By 2006, the company decided to differentiate its offerings by providing some services through a different unit; Wharf T&T would focus on business clients and subsidiary i-Cable Communications, residential ones.

In 2007, it founded Wharf T&T eBusiness Limited, a subsidiary that delivers broadband applications and web applications to SME customers.

In 2016, MBK Partners, North Asia’s buyout firm, and TPG, a global alternative asset firm, have completed the acquisition of Wharf T&T Limited from The Wharf (Holdings) Limited on 9 November 2016. 

In 2017, Wharf T&T Limited announced the Company name change to WTT HK Limited (“WTT”).

However, in 2018, it was announced that WTT HK will be merged with HKBN. The deal was approved by the regulators and completed in the same year. In September 2019, WTT HK Limited was renamed into HKBN Enterprise Solutions HK Limited, as part of HKBN's unit HKBN Enterprise Solutions.

Subsidiaries
Subsidiaries include COL Limited, which provides IT services to businesses having more than "40 years experience in the IT sector"; and WTT eBusiness Limited (WeB), which was established in January 2007 and is an Internet service provider catering to SMEs.

References

External links
 
COL Limited
Wharf T&T eBusiness Limited

Telecommunications companies established in 1995
Telecommunications companies disestablished in 2019
Telecommunications companies of Hong Kong
The Wharf (Holdings)
Internet service providers of Hong Kong
Privately held companies of Hong Kong

zh:滙港電訊